Ravindazaq (also Romanized as Ravīndazaq; also known as Ravīndūzaq and Qūnāq Qerān) is a village in Gharbi Rural District, in the Central District of Ardabil County, Ardabil Province, Iran. At the 2006 census, its population was 297 in 60 families.

References 

Towns and villages in Ardabil County